The 2012 Atlantic Coast Conference baseball tournament was held at the NewBridge Bank Park in Greensboro, North Carolina, from May 23 through 27. All of the games were shown live on Fox Sports South with select games being shown on Fox Sports Florida, Comcast Mid-Atlantic, Sun Sports, and New England Sports Network. Eighth seeded Georgia Tech won the tournament and earned the Atlantic Coast Conference's automatic bid to the 2012 NCAA Division I baseball tournament. It was Georgia Tech's eighth ACC tournament win. This was the first time in which an eighth seeded team won the tournament.

Seeding

Seeding based on team's conference winning percentage. Top team from each division is ranked 1st and 2nd followed by the six teams with the next best conference winning percentage, regardless of division.

Tournament

Notes
† - Denotes extra innings
‡ - Denotes game shortened due to mercy rule
1 - Miami beat North Carolina head-to-head

Results
All times shown are US EDT.  All games, except the championship game, will have a 10-run rule in effect.

Division A

Division B

Championship final

All-Tournament Team

See also
College World Series
NCAA Division I Baseball Championship

References

Tournament
Atlantic Coast Conference baseball tournament
Atlantic Coast Conference baseball tournament
Atlantic Coast Conference baseball tournament
Baseball in North Carolina
College sports in North Carolina
History of Greensboro, North Carolina
Sports competitions in Greensboro, North Carolina